The Somali Chamber of Commerce and Industry (SCCI) is a trade organization headquartered in Mogadishu, Somalia. It serves as an umbrella group for the local business community. Membership is also open to international investors.

See also
First Somali Bank

Notes

External links
Somali Chamber of Commerce and Industry - Official website

Economy of Somalia
Companies of Somalia
Economy of Mogadishu